Jean-François Hory (15 May 1949 – 28 December 2017) was a French politician. From 1981 to 1986, he was a member of the National Assembly. In 1989, he became a member of the European Parliament (MEP). While serving as an MEP, he was elected president of the Radical Party of the Left in 1992, a position that he held until 1996. In February 1995, he declared his candidacy for the French presidential election but later withdrew.

Hory was born on 15 May 1949 in Neufchâteau, Vosges. He died of cancer at the age of 68 on 28 December 2017 in Burgundy.

References

1949 births
2017 deaths
People from Neufchâteau, Vosges
Politicians from Grand Est
Radical Party of the Left politicians
Deputies of the 7th National Assembly of the French Fifth Republic
Radical Party of the Left MEPs
MEPs for France 1989–1994
MEPs for France 1994–1999
20th-century French lawyers
21st-century French lawyers
Deaths from cancer in France